Loreto College is a Roman Catholic sixth form college in Hulme, Manchester, England, based on the educational philosophy of Mary Ward, a 16th-century nun, who founded the Institute of the Blessed Virgin Mary, the congregation of religious sisters who started the college in 1851.

Awards and Achievements
 Loreto College was rated as "Outstanding in every respect" Ofsted 2010.
 Loreto College has also achieved the AoC Beacon Schools Award.
 The college has had 5 students gaining places on the Prime Minister's Global Fellowship programme. It achieved its first student in the inaugural year, 2008.
 Based on ALP's analysis between 2011 and 2013 (Advanced Level Performance) Loreto College has been placed in the top 1% of colleges nationally.
 Highest A-Level Results of any college in Manchester.
 Ranked as the first sixth form college in the country for value added, according to Government legal tables, three years on the run.
 Manchester Evening News named Loreto as one of "The Best in Britain".
 Ofsted recognises that the majority of students achieve Grades A & B at advanced level.

Location
The school is on the western edge of Manchester, near the boundary with Trafford and the Church of St Mary, Hulme. It is accessed via Princess Road, the A5103.

The college campus was redeveloped from 2002 to 2014 when four buildings were constructed. The campus has two smaller buildings, the Chapel which is home to the Art and Design Department and a Sports Hall. Most of learning faculties are situated in the four main buildings on the campus.
Ball Building - Theology, Business Studies, Accounting, Economics, Modern Foreign Languages, Travel and Tourism, History, Geography, Politics, Classical Civilisation and Science.
St. Joseph's Building - Mathematics and Science.
Ward Building - Law, Sociology, Health and Social Care and Psychology. 
Sports Hall - Physical Education.
Ellis and Kennedy Building - Library, Graphics, 3D Design, Photography, Media Studies, Film Studies, Music, Music Technology, Dance, Drama,               English Language, English Literature, I.C.T. and Computing.
Chapel and Creative Arts Building - Art and Design and Textiles.

Admissions
Loreto College is an oversubscribed college and a priority system exists for applications. Approximately 52% of the students at Loreto College are Roman Catholic but the college is open to all faiths who share the same values of Excellence, Freedom, Internationality, Justice, Sincerity, Truth and Joy.

The hierarchy of priority is:
 Pupils from Roman Catholic partnership schools across Greater Manchester (guaranteed a place).
 Pupils from other Roman Catholic Schools.
 Pupils from Trinity CE High School.
 Roman Catholic pupils at Non-Religious Schools.
 Pupils from all other Schools.

Pupils studying at Roman Catholic partnership schools in Greater Manchester are guaranteed a place at Loreto if they wish to go. The fifteen Roman Catholic partnership schools are (in order of proximity to Loreto College) are as follows; Loreto High School, Chorlton High School, St Peter's RC High School, The Barlow RC High School, St Paul's RC High School, Our Lady's RC High School, St Matthew's RC High School, St Ambrose Barlow RC High School, Blessed Thomas Holford Catholic College, St Patrick's RC High School, St Monica's High School, St Damian's RC Science College, St Thomas More RC College and St Philip Howard Catholic Voluntary Academy.

Prospective students must also meet GCSE entry requirements to study AS Level or BTEC Qualifications.

Notable people associated with Loreto

Alumni
 Chris Bisson, actor
 Michael Johnson, footballer (Manchester City)
 Micah Richards, footballer (Manchester City)
 Jason Manford, comedian
 John Harris, columnist (The Guardian) 
 Mike Kane is MP for Wythenshawe and Sale East (UK Parliament constituency) 
 Karl Lucas, actor, comedian
 Pat McDonagh (1934-2014), fashion designer who became an important figure in Canadian fashion.
 Michaela Morgan, author
 Matthew Williamson, fashion designer
 John Bradley-West, actor (Game of Thrones)
 Carla Henry, actress
 Joshua Andrew Howard, para-athlete
 Hannah Witton, YouTube video creator

Teachers
 Pete Postlethwaite (OBE) (1946–2011), formerly Head of Drama at Loreto

See also
 Loreto College, St Albans.
 Loreto Grammar School in nearby Trafford (known as Loreto Convent).

References

External links
 EduBase

Sixth form colleges in Greater Manchester
Education in Manchester
Educational institutions established in 1851
Defunct grammar schools in England
Catholic secondary schools in the Diocese of Salford
Catholic universities and colleges in England
1851 establishments in England